Bhuiyar / Kori Dharmshala, also known as Shri Kabir Ashram Dharmarth Trust Samiti, is a dharamshala in the holy city of Haridwar in the Uttarakhand state of India. The dharmshala is situated near Rishikul Ayurvedic College, Haridwar.

History
In 1950, five members of Bhuiyar samaj bought 1,605 square feet of land for making the Kabir Ashram in Devpura, Haridwar, there was a room and veranda built on this plot and was nominated as a Mahant in the Kabir Ashram whose name was Mr. Birbal Das. The Ashram’s work was running smoothly, but in the meantime Mahant Birbal Das died in 1975 and his mausoleum was built in the Ashram. After some time society has formed with a social Body of the Ashram, whose name was "Gaddi Kabir Saheb".

In 2005, some aware people of the Bhuiyar and Kori Samaj to build a Trust. Whose name was put "Shri Kabir Ashram Dharmarth Trust Samiti (Regd.)". The Trust was registered from Tehsil Haridwar and Chit Fund Society Dehradun. Then in September 2007, the land of the Ashram has been registered in the name of Trust.

After Trust forming, the Ashram operations were running smoothly, and every year the birthday of Sri Kabir Saheb Ji on Jyeshth Purnima (जेयष्ठ पूर्णिमा) was celebrated with great pomp by the Bhuiyar / Kori Samaj. In this order, 18 June 2008 on the occasion of the birthday of Shri Kabir Saheb Ji a procession was taking by the Bhuiyar / Kori Samaj.  As the procession of the Bhuiyar / Koli people arrived at the Ashram, during this time some outside elements started fighting with the Bhuiyar / Kori people in the Ashram.  In procession panicked because of the fights and many bhuiyar / Kori people were injured.

In 2010, the Trust called a meeting, and Mr. Dayaram Singh Bhamra a member of the Trust was suggested that a new building was built in place of old building of the Ashram.  It was decided that the old building of the Ashram should be destroyed and a new building to be built in its place. On 28 April 2010,  laid the foundation stone of the new building of the ashram. In May 2010, removing the old building of the Ashram by the Trust, and a new double storey building was made on its place. According to the membership register of the Trust, there are 205 lifelong members of the Trust. As per Trust Rules, only lifelong members can participate in the election of the Trust, and the person of Bhuiyar and Kori Samaj can participate only in the Kabir Ashram, any other person belong to other society or community cannot participate in the Kabir Ashram.

Significance
The Bhuiyar Dharmshala is one of the oldest dharmshala in Haridwar. Thousands of pilgrims from the Bhuiyar Samaj visit it, especially during the annual festival of Kabir Prakatotsav on Jayeshtha Purnima when they celebrate the birthday of Saint Kabir Saheb. Bhuiyar people is organize a procession this day, which is rotated all over the city. The procession is being held from many years. After the procession the society flag is flown by society. Many Sadhusant and Mahatma participate in the procession as well.

Gallery

References

BHUIYAR SAMAJ (AMAR UJALA NEWS)
कबीर प्रकटोत्सव दिवस समाचार

External links 

wikimapia -  Bhuiyar Dharmshala
भुईयार समाज के छात्र पुरस्कृत
लक्ष्य को संघर्ष करें छात्र: दयाराम भामड़ा

Dharmshalas
Buildings and structures in Haridwar